Luscher or Lüscher is a surname. Notable people with the surname include:

Christian Lüscher (born 1963), Swiss attorney and politician
Christian Lüscher (neurobiologist) (born 1963), Swiss neurobiologist
Gustav S. Luscher (1856–1943), American businessman and politician
Henry R. Luscher, American politician
Ingeborg Lüscher (born 1936), German-Swiss artist
Jonas Lüscher (born 1976), Swiss-German writer and essayist
Max Lüscher (1923–2017), Swiss psychotherapist
Peter Lüscher (born 1956), Swiss alpine ski racer 
Rudolf Lüscher (born 1945), Swiss former wrestler 
Susanne Lüscher, Swiss orienteering competitor
Sven Lüscher (born 1984), Swiss footballer